This is a list of the 41 Romanian counties, and one city with special status (Bucharest, the national capital) by GDP and GDP per capita.

List of counties by GDP 
Counties by GDP in 2015 according to data by the OECD.

List of counties by GDP per capita
Counties by GDP per capita in 2015 according to data by the OECD.

References 

Counties by GDP
Gross state product
 GDP
Ranked lists of country subdivisions